Nittany Lion Inn is a hotel located on the campus of Pennsylvania State University in State College, Pennsylvania. Built by Consolidated Hotel Service Inc., the Nittany Lion Inn and was opened in 1931. Its location near the Nittany Lion Shrine and Rec Hall. The location is currently being used as student housing because of the COVID-19 pandemic.

History

A 75-room colonial style inn, planned for development on the campus of Pennsylvania State University, was announced in March 1930. The development and operation of the Inn was managed New York City company Consolidated Hotel Service Inc. as the newest in a chain of 11 college hotels as a part of Treadway Inns. The project broke ground on May 1, 1930, with 65 workers employed. The lot in which the Inn was built on was located behind New Beaver Field's west stands and near Rec Hall.

The exterior of the inn was 125 feet tall painted greenish-blue and white with a stone portico. To the left of the building was a parking garage designed similar architecture with parking spaces for 20 vehicles. Inside of the inn featured 75 hotel rooms with the ability to accommodate 150 guests, a main dining space for 300 guests with an additional three dining spaces with room for 175 patrons in each. The entire hotel was furnished in the colonial style. The Nittany Lion Inn was formally opened to the public on May 5, 1931. To celebrate the opening 250 trustees and faculty were invited to the inn for a dinner and dance. The initial cost of a stay at the Nittany Lion Inn was $3.50 a night.

The Nittany Lion Inn was expanded in January 1953 with the addition of an east wing. The wing contained a grill, a meeting room and 75 hotel rooms bringing the total available to 150. The project was completed by Irwin and Leighton, a Philadelphia contractor, at a cost of $1,072,000.

A 15-foot sinkhole opened up on the grounds of the inn after a limestone cavern wore away in early April 1957. The sinkhole damaged a sewer line and was repaired shortly after its collapse.

A 132,000 square foot expansion and renovation took place on the Nittany Lion Inn in October 1990. The expansion added alumni offices, a lounge, 4 handicapped-accessible rooms, 500-seat ballroom, multiple meeting room, indoor hot tub, Gift shop, workout facility, enclosed atrium, expanded kitchen space and 136 guest rooms bring the total hotel rooms to 223. The Inn's main entrance was also moved to the north side of the building facing Park Avenue. The Inn also received new furniture influenced by 18th-century Chippendale, Sheraton and Hepplewhite styles. The renovations were completed in January 1992 by Biehn Construction at a cost of $15,000,000. During the renovation of the Inn, the International Union of Operating Engineers, Local No. 66, protested the use of a non-union contractor Stone Valley Construction Company, a subcontractor of Biehn Construction.

The Nittany Lion Inn was converted into temporary student housing and classrooms in 2020 due to the COVID-19 pandemic. Initially the space was used as a quarantine dormitory for infected students. It was announced that the hotel would continue to serve as student housing through the 2021–2022 academic year with no set plan to return to operation.

The Penn State Board of Trustees approved a ground lease for The Nittany Lion Inn with the Scholar Hotel Group in June of 2022. With the sale approval the University announced the Nittany Lion Inn would remain closed until 2024.

Famous visitors 
 Dwight D. Eisenhower
 Lyndon B. Johnson
 Eleanor Roosevelt
 George H. W. Bush
 Louis Armstrong
 Robert Frost
 Danny DeVito
 Jack Nicholson
 George Howard Earle III
 Joseph F. Guffey
 Styles Bridges
Felix Schnyder
George M. Leader

References

External links
 

Hotels in Pennsylvania
Hotels established in 1931
Buildings and structures in Centre County, Pennsylvania
Pennsylvania State University